The Trusted Data Format (TDF) is a data object encoding specification for the purposes of enabling data tagging and cryptographic security features.  These features include assertion of data properties or tags, cryptographic binding and data encryption.  The TDF is freely available with no restrictions and requires no use of proprietary or patented technology and is thus open for anyone to use.

Overview 

The TDF Specification is based on a Trusted Data Object (TDO) which can be grouped together into a Trusted Data Collection (TDC).  Each TDO consists of a data payload which can be associated with an unlimited number of metadata objects.  The TDO supports the cryptographic binding of the metadata objects to the payload data object. In addition, both data and metadata objects can be associated with a block of encryption information which is used by any TDF consumer to decrypt the associated data or metadata if it had been encrypted.  A TDC allows for additional metadata objects to apply to a set of TDOs.

Implementations 

The United States Intelligence Community maintains the IC-TDF, which includes government-specific tagging requirements on top of the core TDF capabilities mentioned above, in an XML Data Encoding Specification.

Virtru offers client-side email and file encryption based on the TDF.

The United States Department of Defense uses TDF to implement the Department of Defense Discovery Metadata Specification (DDMS).

References

External links
 US Office of the Director of National Intelligence website on the TDF Specification
Wood, Mollie, Easier Ways to Protect Email From Unwanted Prying Eyes, New York Times, July 16, 2014 video and article

Cryptography standards
XML-based standards